Castello is the largest of the six sestieri of Venice, Italy.

History
There had been, since at least the 8th-century, small settlements of the islands of San Pietro di Castello (for which the sestiere is named). This island was also called Isola d'Olivolo.

From the thirteenth century onward, the district grew around a naval dockyard on what was originally the Isole Gemini.  The land in the district was dominated by the Arsenale of the Republic of Venice, then the largest naval complex in Europe. A Greek mercantile community numbering around 5,000 in the Renaissance and late Middle Ages was based in this district, with the Flanginian School and the Greek Orthodox Church of San Giorgio dei Greci being located here, of which the former comprises the Hellenic Institute of Byzantine and Post-Byzantine Studies in Venice and the latter is now the seat of the Greek Orthodox Archdiocese of Italy.

Other significant structures were by the monasteries in the north of the quarter.

Napoleon closed the Arsenal and planned what are now the Bienniale Gardens. More recently the island of Sant'Elena has been created, and more land drained at other extremities of Castello.

Landmarks
Prominent sites and buildings in Castello include:
Church of Santi Giovanni e Paolo (San Zanipoli)
Church of San Giorgio dei Greci
Campo Santa Maria Formosa and Church of Santa Maria Formosa
Church and Ospedale della Pietà
Church of San Zaccaria
Church of San Giovanni di Malta
Scuola of San Giorgio degli Schiavoni
Scuola di San Marco
Venetian Arsenal
Church of Sant'Elena
Palazzo Malipiero-Trevisan
Palazzo Vitturi
Palazzo Zorzi Bon

See also

References

 
Sestieri of Venice